The Church of Jesus Christ of Latter-day Saints in Taiwan refers to the Church of Jesus Christ of Latter-day Saints (LDS Church) and its members in Taiwan. Having 62,098 members in 2021, Taiwan has more members of the church than any Country or Territory in the Church's Asia Area.

History

In June 1956, four missionaries arrived in Taiwan.

Hu Wei-I, a convert, helped translate the Book of Mormon into Mandarin Chinese.

In November 1984, Gordon B. Hinckley dedicated the Taipei Taiwan Temple.

Stakes
As of February 2023, the LDS Church has the following 16 stakes in Taiwan:

Missions

Temples

On November 17, 1984 the Taipei Taiwan Temple was dedicated by Gordon B. Hinckley. 

On October 3, 2021, the Kaohsiung Taiwan Temple was announced by church president Russell M. Nelson.

See also

 Religion in Taiwan:Latter Day Saints
 Christianity in Taiwan:Latter Day Saints

References

External links